Karel Jungwiert (born 1 November 1944) is a Czech lawyer, and has been the Judge of the European Court of Human Rights in respect of the Czech Republic since the country's accession to the Council of Europe in 1993. His term at the Court ended on 31 October 2012.

Early life
Jungwiert was born in Vlkovce (a village near Benešov). He obtained a Doctorate in Law from the Charles University in Prague, the oldest and largest university in the Czech Republic in 1969, and was admitted as a barrister in 1974.

Career
Jungwiert practised at the Bar until 1989, and in 1990 was appointed Head of the Secretariat of the Federal Assembly of Czechoslovakia. In 1993, the State of Czechoslovakia was dissolved, and Jungwiert became a judge of the Supreme Court of the newly formed Czech Republic. Later that year, he was elected the judge in respect of the Czech Republic at the European Court of Human Rights. His term at the Court ended on 31 October 2012.

See also
European Court of Human Rights
List of judges of the European Court of Human Rights

References

External links
Website of the European Court of Human Rights

1944 births
Living people
Judges of the European Court of Human Rights
Supreme Court of the Czech Republic judges
Charles University alumni
Czech judges of international courts and tribunals